Jhulliam Bonfim Santos Pires (born 4 April 1988, Vera Cruz, Bahia), or simply Jhulliam, is a Brazilian footballer who plays for Pouso Alegre FC.

Career

Club
Jhulliam signed for Moldovan National Division side FC Sheriff Tiraspol. On 26 August 2014, Jhulliam signed for North American Soccer League side Indy Eleven, with the club declining to renew his contract upon completion of the 2014 season.

Honours
Sheriff Tiraspol	
Moldovan National Division: 2013–14
Moldovan Super Cup: 2014;

References

External links

Profile at FC Sheriff Tiraspol

Jhulliam at ZeroZero

Living people
1988 births
Footballers from São Paulo (state)
Brazilian footballers
Brazilian expatriate footballers
Esporte Clube Bahia players
FC Sheriff Tiraspol players
Indy Eleven players
Galícia Esporte Clube players
São Cristóvão de Futebol e Regatas players
Juazeiro Social Clube players
Associação Atlética Coruripe players
Sport Club Corinthians Alagoano players
Resende Futebol Clube players
Al-Hilal Club (Omdurman) players
Sampaio Corrêa Futebol Clube players
Agremiação Sportiva Arapiraquense players
Volta Redonda FC players
Uberlândia Esporte Clube players
Esporte Clube Jacuipense players
Associação Atlética Portuguesa (RJ) players
Villa Nova Atlético Clube players
Campeonato Brasileiro Série C players
Campeonato Brasileiro Série D players
North American Soccer League players
Moldovan Super Liga players
Brazilian expatriate sportspeople in Moldova
Brazilian expatriate sportspeople in the United States
Brazilian expatriate sportspeople in Sudan
Expatriate footballers in Moldova
Expatriate soccer players in the United States
Expatriate footballers in Sudan
Association football forwards